Richard Allen (1830–1909) was an African American community and political leader in Houston, Texas. He was elected to the Twelfth Texas Legislature in 1869 and the Thirteenth Legislature in 1873, though his latter win was contested. Allen was active in the Republican Party of Texas and served as a delegate at Texas Republican conventions. In 1878, he was nominated for lieutenant governor of Texas, making him the first African American person to seek statewide office in Texas.

Allen co-founded Houston's Emancipation Park in 1872.

Life and career 
Allen was born into slavery in Richmond, Virginia. He was brought to Harris County, Texas in 1837 where he remained enslaved until emancipation in 1865.

Allen was a skilled carpenter and is credited with designing and building the home of Houston's mayor, Joseph R. Morris. Upon emancipation, he worked as a contractor and bridge builder.

In 1867, Allen became a federal voter registrar. In 1868, he was an agent of the Freedmen's Bureau and supervisor of voter registration for the Fourteenth District of Texas. Allen was active in the Republican Party of Harris County and was elected to the Twelfth Texas Legislature as a representative of the Fourteenth District in 1869. In 1870, he unsuccessfully sought a Republican nomination for the United States Congress. He was elected to the Thirteenth Legislature in 1873, but his election was contested by the democratic candidate.

In 1878, Allen was elected street commissioner of Houston. He was nominated for lieutenant governor by a conservative wing of the Republican Party that same year, which made him the first African American person to seek statewide office in Texas.

From 1881 to 1882, Allen was quartermaster for the Black regiment of Texas militia.  Between 1882 and 1885 he was a storekeeper and inspector and deputy collector of United States customs at Houston.

He co-founded Houston's Emancipation Park in 1872.

References 

Politicians from Houston
African-American history in Houston
African-American state legislators in Texas
American former slaves

People from Richmond, Virginia
1830 births
1909 deaths